Cassipourea is a genus of flowering plants in the family Rhizophoraceae. There are about 40 species. The genus is divided into several subgenera, based mainly on the structure of the flowers.

Species include:

 Cassipourea acuminata Liben
 Cassipourea brittoniana Fawc. & Rendle
 Cassipourea eketensis Baker f.
 Cassipourea fanshawei Torre & Goncalves
 Cassipourea flanaganii (Schinz) Alston
 Cassipourea hiotou Aubrev. & Pellegrin
 Cassipourea malosana (Baker) Alston
 Cassipourea obovata Alston
 Cassipourea subcordata Britton
 Cassipourea subsessilis Britton
 Cassipourea swaziensis Compton
 Cassipourea thomassetii Alston

References

 
Taxonomy articles created by Polbot